Inigo Campioni (14 November 1878 –  24 May 1944) was an Italian naval officer during most of the first half of the 20th century. He served in four wars, and is best known as an admiral in the Italian Royal Navy (Regia Marina) during World War II. He was later executed by the Italian Social Republic for refusing to collaborate.

Birth and early career
Campioni was born in Viareggio, Province of Lucca, Italy, on 14 November 1878. He entered the Italian Naval Academy at Leghorn (Livorno) in 1893. He graduated in 1896 and was promoted from midshipman to ensign in 1898 and then to lieutenant in 1905.

Campioni participated in the Italo-Turkish War of 1911–1912, serving as an officer aboard the armored cruiser Amalfi.

World War I

During World War I, Campioni served aboard the battleships Conte di Cavour and Andrea Doria. He was promoted to lieutenant commander in 1916 and became commanding officer of the destroyer , which under his command escorted numerous convoys and served with distinction in a naval engagement in September 1917 in the northern Adriatic Sea. For the latter action, Campioni received the Bronze Medal of Military Valor. In December 1918, just after the conclusion of the war, he received the War Merit Cross.

Interwar years
After World War I, Campioni was promoted to commander in 1919 and to captain-lieutenant in 1926. He led naval design programs at the weapons laboratory at La Spezia and became the Italian naval attaché to France in Paris. In 1929 he took command of the battleship Duilio. After leaving Duilio, he became chief of staff of the First Fleet embarked on the heavy cruiser Trieste, and from May 1930 to May 1931 he served as commanding officer of the heavy cruiser Trento.

Campioni achieved flag rank in 1932, being promoted to contrammiraglio ("counter admiral," a rank equivalent to the United States Navy′s rear admiral lower half) and was promoted again to ammiraglio di divisione ("divisional admiral," a rank equivalent to rear admiral) in 1934. He served as Chief Cabinet Secretary of the Navy before commanding the 5th Naval Division during the Second Italo-Abyssinian War of 1935–1936.

Campioni was promoted to ammiraglio di squadra ("squadron vice-admiral," a rank equivalent to vice admiral) in 1936 and in 1938 he assumed the post of Deputy Chief of Staff of the Navy. Held in high regard as the most promising officer in the Regia Marina, he became commander of the 1st Naval Squadron – the Italian main battlefleet – in 1939 with the battleship Giulio Cesare as his flagship. In the same year he became a Senator of the Kingdom of Italy.

World War II

Mediterranean campaign
After Italy entered World War II on 10 June 1940, Campioni commanded the Italian battlefleet during the early months of the Mediterranean naval campaign against the British, including the Battle of Calabria, the Battle of Taranto, Operation White, and the Battle of Cape Spartivento. Heavily criticized for failing to intercept two British convoys and handling his superior force too cautiously during the latter battle, he was relieved of command on 8 December 1940 – to be succeeded by Angelo Iachino – and returned to the post of Deputy Chief of Staff of the Navy. He did, however, become a Commander of the Military Order of Savoy for his achievements from June 1940 through July 1941.

On 15 July 1941, Campioni was appointed governor of the Italian Aegean Islands (or Italian Dodecanese) and made commander of all Axis armed forces operating in that area. In November 1941, he reached retirement age and was transferred to the naval auxiliary, although he remained on active duty as governor and commander in the Aegean.

Dodecanese campaign
Campioni was at his headquarters on the island of Rhodes when the armistice between Italy and the Allies was announced on 8 September 1943. He thereafter refused to collaborate with the Axis Powers and oversaw Italian armed resistance to the German conquest of the Aegean Islands that immediately followed the armistice. On 11 September 1943, the Italian garrison on Rhodes surrendered to German forces, who captured Campioni.

Imprisonment and execution
The Germans placed Campioni in a prisoner-of-war camp at Schokken (now Skoki) in Poland. In January 1944, they transported him to the northern portion of Italy administered by the Italian Social Republic, a German client regime led by Benito Mussolini, which took custody of him and jailed him at Verona. Campioni refused repeated offers to collaborate with the Social Republic. He based his decision on his view that the Social Republic government was illegal and that Italys legitimate government remained the Kingdom of Italy, which controlled the southern part of the country and had switched sides and joined the Allies. As a result of his stance, an Italian Social Republic military tribunal in Parma convicted him of high treason and condemned him to death. The Social Republic offered him a pardon on the condition that he recognize it as Italys legitimate government, but he rejected the pardon and was executed along with Contrammiraglio Luigi Mascherpa and others by a firing squad composed of youths aged 17 and 18 in the city square at Parma on 24 May 1944. The Italian Republic posthumously awarded Campioni the Gold Medal of Military Valor in November 1947. He is buried in the military cemetery at Bari, Italy.

Awards and honors

 Commander of the Military Order of Savoy

 Gold Medal of Military Valour (posthumous)

 Bronze Medal of Military Valor

 War Merit Cross

See also
Battle of the Mediterranean
Battle of Calabria
Battle of Taranto
Operation White
Battle of Cape Spartivento
Dodecanese Campaign

Notes

References
Marina Militare: Inigo CAMPIONI, Ammiraglio di Squadra, Medaglia d'oro al Valor Militare alla
 ABC-CLIO SCHOOLS History and the Headlines: Vanzo, John P., and Gordon E. Hogg, "Campioni, Inigo (1878–1944)"
Stewart, Walter. Admirals of the World: A Biographical Dictionary, 1500 to the Present. Jefferson, North Carolina: McFarland & Company, Inc., 2009. .

1878 births
1944 deaths
Burials in Apulia
Commanders of the Military Order of Savoy
People from Viareggio
People of former Italian colonies
Italian admirals
Italian military personnel of the Italo-Turkish War
Italian military personnel of World War I
Regia Marina personnel of World War II
Italian military personnel killed in World War II
Recipients of the War Merit Cross (Italy)
Recipients of the Bronze Medal of Military Valor
Recipients of the Gold Medal of Military Valor
Greece in World War II
Executed Italian people
People executed by the Italian Social Republic
People executed by Italy by firing squad
Members of the Senate of the Kingdom of Italy
20th-century Italian politicians
Dodecanese under Italian rule